Salman (also Romanized as Salmān) is a village in Bala Khaf Rural District, Salami District, Khaf County, Razavi Khorasan Province, Iran. At the 2006 census, its population was 693, in 150 families.

References 

Populated places in Khaf County